Wythoff's game is a two-player mathematical subtraction game, played with two piles of counters. Players take turns removing counters from one or both piles; when removing counters from both piles, the numbers of counters removed from each pile must be equal. The game ends when one player removes the last counter or counters, thus winning.

An equivalent description of the game is that a single chess queen is placed somewhere on a large grid of squares, and each player can move the queen towards the lower left corner of the grid: south, west, or southwest, any number of steps. The winner is the player who moves the queen into the corner. The two Cartesian coordinates of the queen correspond to the sizes of two piles in the formulation of the game involving removing counters from piles.

Martin Gardner in his March 1977 "Mathematical Games column" in Scientific American claims that the game was played in China under the name 捡石子 jiǎn shízǐ ("picking stones"). The Dutch mathematician W. A. Wythoff published a mathematical analysis of the game in 1907.

Optimal strategy

Any position in the game can be described by a pair of integers (n, m) with n ≤ m, describing the size of both piles in the position or the coordinates of the queen. The strategy of the game revolves around cold positions and hot positions: in a cold position, the player whose turn it is to move will lose with best play, while in a hot position, the player whose turn it is to move will win with best play. The optimal strategy from a hot position is to move to any reachable cold position.

The classification of positions into hot and cold can be carried out recursively with the following three rules:
(0,0) is a cold position.
Any position from which a cold position can be reached in a single move is a hot position.
If every move leads to a hot position, then a position is cold.

For instance, all positions of the form  (0, m) and (m, m) with m > 0 are hot, by rule 2. However, the position (1,2) is cold, because the only positions that can be reached from it, (0,1), (0,2), (1,0) and (1,1), are all hot. The cold positions (n, m) with the smallest values of n and m are (0, 0), (1, 2), (3, 5), (4, 7), (6, 10) and (8, 13).

For misère game of this game, (0, 1) and (2, 2) are cold positions, and a position (n, m) with m, n > 2 is cold if and only if (n, m) in normal game is cold.

Formula for cold positions
Wythoff discovered that the cold positions follow a regular pattern determined by the golden ratio. Specifically, if k is any natural number and 

where φ is the golden ratio and we are using the floor function, then (nk, mk) is the kth cold position.

The two sequences nk and mk are the Beatty sequences associated with the equation

As is true in general for pairs of Beatty sequences, these two sequences are complementary: each positive integer appears exactly once in either sequence.

See also
 Nim
 Grundy's game
 Subtract a square
 Wythoff array

References

External links

 

Mathematical games